Fishersgate railway station is a railway station in West Sussex, England, serving both the eastern part of Southwick, as well as the western part of Portslade in Brighton and Hove. The station is operated by Southern and is  down the line from Brighton.

Location
The station is unusually close to a major boundary, one which is urban with no nearby buffer zones – immediately east of the station is the Vale Park part of Portslade and higher Portslade Village for which this is the nearest station. Fishersgate itself amounts in its mainland residential part to an outlying part of either that greater community, discounting its community church, or the east end of Southwick, having its football stadium much closer to the station than Southwick railway station for example.  The east arm of Shoreham Harbour is separated from the English Channel by a 200 metre wide shingle spit with warehouses, and storage/loading yards. The western end of the spit of land, closer to Southwick, is the site of the gas turbine Shoreham Power Station and a Southern Water sewage treatment plant.

History
The station was opened by the London, Brighton and South Coast Railway on 3 September 1905, and was originally named Fishersgate Halt. On 5 May 1969 it was renamed Fishersgate.

There is step-free access to both platforms.

The station is operated by Southern and is on the West Coastway Line. It has no ticket office, instead, a cash or credit card ticket machine.

Services
All services at Fishersgate are operated by Southern using  EMUs.

The typical off-peak service in trains per hour is:
 1 tph to 
 1 tph to 

References

External links

 Adur District Council, see also Adur (district)

Railway stations in West Sussex
Former London, Brighton and South Coast Railway stations
Railway stations in Great Britain opened in 1905
Railway stations served by Govia Thameslink Railway